Nica Noelle is an American entrepreneur, pornographic film actress and director, as well as a writer whose essays have appeared in Salon, The Huffington Post and Hustler. She is the co-founder of adult film studios Sweetheart Video, Sweet Sinner, Sweet Sinema, Girl Candy Films, Rock Candy films, Hot Candy Films, and TransRomantic Films.

Career

As performer
Noelle began her career at the age of 19, working at a psychodrama house in New York City. Afterwards, she became a columnist for underground adult magazines, but she soon switched to porn after she began writing for magazines like $pread.

As director
After writing, directing and performing in some scenes for the lesbian-porn studio Girlfriends Films, Noelle and Mile High Media (an adult film production/distribution company) founded rival lesbian-porn company Sweetheart Video, straight couples-themed brand Sweet Sinner, and Hollywood-inspired brand Sweet Sinema. Through November 2011, Noelle was the sole writer and director of every title from each of these companies. Each of the studios' productions are distributed through Mile High Media. Noelle received an AVN Award nomination for Director of the Year in 2010.

In 2011, Noelle began directing for Mile High Media's then-new company, Sweet Sinema. However, she resigned from Mile High Media that November to sign a new deal with AEBN to create new porn brands Girl Candy Films (lesbian sex), Hard Candy Films (straight), Rock Candy Films (gay), and TransRomantic Films (transgender). Hard Candy Films has since been renamed Hot Candy Films.

Noelle has also written about her career on her Huffington Post blog and on Salon.com.

Personal life
Noelle is Irish and Welsh on her mother's side and Danish and Italian on her father's side.

Noelle has a son and a daughter.

She identifies as bisexual.

Awards and nominations

References

External links

 
 
 

American sex columnists
American women columnists
American pornographic film actresses
American people of Danish descent
American people of Irish descent
American people of Welsh descent
American pornographic film directors
American women in business
Bisexual pornographic film actresses
Directors of lesbian pornographic films
American LGBT businesspeople
LGBT film directors
American LGBT actors
LGBT people from New York (state)
Living people
People from Manhattan
Pornographic film actors from New York (state)
Sweetheart Video
Women pornographic film directors
Journalists from New York City
1976 births
Film directors from New York City
Educators from New York City
American women educators
21st-century American women
American people of Italian descent
American bisexual writers